Brianna "Bri" Lee (born 13 December 1991) is an Australian author, journalist, and activist, known for her 2018 memoir Eggshell Skull.

Career

Writing and journalism 
Lee's early writing work included a short story published in Voiceworks, while serving as the founder and editor of the (now defunct) feminist quarterly periodical Hot Chicks with Big Brains. Hot Chicks with Big Brains ran from 2015-2018, spanning seven issues. It featured articles and interviews with diverse women and non-binary people, including Darug elder Aunty Jacinta Tobin, Isabella Manfredi, Mehreen Faruqi, Ruby Tandoh, and Clementine Ford.

Lee's first book, the memoir Eggshell Skull was published by Allen and Unwin in early 2018. It describes Lee's experience as a complainant in the Australian court system for sexual abuse she was subjected to as a child, whilst simultaneously working as a Judge's Associate working on similar cases. The memoir was well received, winning several awards including the People's Choice Award at the 2019 Victorian Premier's Literary Awards, and the Davitt Award.

In October 2019, Lee's essay Beauty was published by Allen and Unwin. In the essay, Lee examines her struggles with disordered eating. It was praised for its dissection of corporate middle class culture.

In 2020 Lee was appointed the Australian Copyright Agency's Writer-in-Residence at the University of Technology Sydney.

Her book, Who Gets to Be Smart, was published in 2021 by Allen and Unwin.

Advocacy and media 
Together with Bond University’s Professor Jonathan Crowe, Lee co-authored legal research and built ConsentLawQLD.com, a platform for the advocacy which led to the Queensland Attorney-General referring consent and the ‘mistake of fact,’ defence to the Law Reform Commission in 2019. Lee has been featured in advertising campaigns for brands including Sportsgirl, Mimco, Camilla & Marc, and Fashion Journal. Her advocacy has been recognised with a shortlisting for Women’s Agenda Leadership awards and a placement as one of 2019 Fin Review’s ‘women of influence’.

In 2021, in partnership with the Women's Justice Network and GleeBooks, Lee launched 'Freadom Inside,' an initiative facilitating the provision of books to inmates in women's correctional facilities in New South Wales.

Lee hosts the 'B List Bookclub;' a monthly bookclub featuring Australian and international authors, with the State Library of New South Wales. Lee has made several appearances on the ABC program 'The Drum,' as well as appearing on Radio National, discussing issues such as law reform, and her written work.

Awards

References

External links 

 

Australian women's rights activists
1991 births
Australian writers
Living people